"Trippin'" is the debut single from New Zealand rock band Push Push. The song was also recorded around the same time by Auckland punk stalwarts "The Warners" (1984–1995) and appeared on the Crazy Horses single released by Wildside Records. "Trippin'" reached number one in New Zealand for six weeks and peaked at number 25 in Australia.

Music video
The music video is a performance video directed by Chris Mauger. It won Best Music Video at the 1992 New Zealand Music Awards.

Charts

Weekly charts

Year-end charts

Certifications

Awards

Cover versions
In 1999, New Zealand electronic act Baitercell released a techno version featuring American-Australian performer Miz Ima Starr. The song later appeared in the film I'll Make You Happy and its soundtrack CD which was released by Flying Nun Records.

References

External links
 Trippin' music video, New Zealand on Screen

1991 debut singles
1991 songs
Number-one singles in New Zealand
Push Push (band) songs